Elizabeth Mary Palmer (1832–1897) was a New Zealand music and singing teacher, performer, composer, and entertainment promoter. She was born in Bramford, Suffolk, England. She is known for her composition Twas only a dream (1884).

References

1832 births
1897 deaths
New Zealand composers
19th-century New Zealand women singers
New Zealand music teachers
19th-century composers
Women music educators
19th-century women composers
British emigrants to New Zealand